The Society of Pathseekers of the Islamic Revolution or Society for the Adherents of the Path of the Islamic Revolution is an Iranian principlist political group, founded in 2008.

Members 
Alireza Zakani is General Secretary of the party. The group was formed a fraction inside Iranian Parliament, and is close to Ahmad Tavakoli. Elyas Naderan is a member in the central council.

Party leaders

Political stance
They are part of Front of Transformationalist Principlists, alongside Society of Devotees of the Islamic Revolution. The Pathseekers were supporters of Mahmoud Ahmadinejad until 2011. The Pathseekers have differences with Front of Islamic Revolution Stability, however they formed an alliance against Ali Larijani's fraction in the Parliament.

References 

Principlist political groups in Iran
Political parties established in 2008